Astragalus grammocalyx is a species of milkvetch in the family Fabaceae. The species flowers from May to June and fruits from June to July.

Description 
The species is a perennial plant of grayish–blue color. It lacks stems and has subterranean stolons. It has dense pubescence that are square in shape and have simple hairs. It has 10–16 small leaflets in pairs which are ovate–elliptic in shape and its inflorescence is dense but not elongating after flowering. Its calyx is tubular and inflated and its petals are a violet color.

Distribution 
The species is extremely limited in its range and is considered critically endangered. It is found in a small 10 square kilometer area in Khosrov Forest State Reserve of Armenia. It grows in the subalpine belt at 2.5 kilometers above sea levels and is found in dry slopes, screes, on the steppe, and in open juniper forests.

References

grammocalyx